Killyon GAA is a Gaelic Athletic Association club based in Killyon, Hill of Down, County Meath, County Meath. The club is exclusively concerned with the game of hurling.

History

Honours

 Meath Senior Hurling Championship (7): 1918, 1979, 1980, 1981, 1984, 1991, 2005

External links
 General information

Gaelic games clubs in County Meath
Hurling clubs in County Meath